Maha Hasan is a Pakistani television actress. She appeared in many television series. Her notable television appearances are in television series such as Ishqiya (2020), Nand (2020),Safar Tamam Howa (2021) and Yunhi (2023).

Career 
Hasan was born and raised in Karachi, Pakistan. She graduated from National Academy of Performing Arts, Karachi.

She made her on-screen debut in 2020 with Big Bang Entertainment's Ishqiya, and later appeared in Nand in a supporting role. In 2021, she appeared in Momina Duraid's Safar Tamam Howa alongside Madiha Imam and Ali Rehman Khan. She portrayed the role of a young one who is mentally challenged, and was praised for her performance.

Filmography

Television series

Web series

Awards and nominations

References

External links 
 

1994 births
21st-century Pakistani actresses
Living people
Pakistani television actresses